Mangalia shipyard is a large shipyard located  south of the Port of Constanţa, in Mangalia, Romania.

Daewoo Heavy Industries era 
In 1997  Daewoo-Mangalia Heavy Industries  or DMHI was formed as a joint venture between South Korean company Daewoo Shipbuilding & Marine Engineering and the 2 Mai Shipyard in Mangalia. Since it was founded the company built over 127 new ships and repaired around 300 ships.

Operations
One of the main customers of the shipyard is the German company Hamburg Süd which ordered six container ships of around  each, and seven ships of  each as well as four tugboats. The company also signed in 2005 an agreement with Mediterranean Shipping Company S.A., NSB Niederelbe, Gebab and Conti Reederei companies for the construction of 12 container ships of around  each that will be delivered in stages until 2011 at a total cost of US$1.1 billion.

Goliath Crane 

In 2008 the shipyard bought the largest gantry crane in North America, the Goliath Crane, formerly located in Quincy, Massachusetts, from the General Dynamics company. The cranes's re-assembly has been under way since March 2009.

References

External links 

 Official site

Mangalia
Privatized companies in Romania
Shipyards of Romania
Shipbuilding companies of Romania
Companies of Constanța County